Vetle Vinje (born 14 March 1962) is a Norwegian competition rower and Olympic medalist.

He competed in the men's coxed pair event at the 1984 Summer Olympics. He received a silver medal in quadruple sculls at the 1988 Summer Olympics in Seoul, together with Alf Hansen, Rolf Thorsen, and Lars Bjønness. Vinje received a silver medal in quadruple sculls in the 1987 world championships, with the same team.

He represented the club Bærum RK. He is a son of Finn-Erik Vinje and is married to politician Kristin Vinje.

Vinje has a cand.scient. degree from 1989 and a dr.scient. degree from 1999, both in geophysics, from the University of Oslo.

References

1962 births
Living people
Norwegian male rowers
Olympic rowers of Norway
Olympic silver medalists for Norway
Rowers at the 1984 Summer Olympics
Rowers at the 1988 Summer Olympics
Sportspeople from Bærum
Olympic medalists in rowing
Norwegian geophysicists
University of Oslo alumni
Medalists at the 1988 Summer Olympics
World Rowing Championships medalists for Norway